Nick Rizzuto may refer to:

 Nick Rizzuto (radio producer)
 Nicolo Rizzuto, Montreal-based Mafioso don, father of Vito Rizzuto
 Nick Rizzuto Jr. (died 2009), Montreal-based Mafioso, son of Vito Rizzuto

See also
Rizzuto crime family